The 1985 Men's South American Volleyball Championship, the 16th such championship, took place in 1985 in Caracas.

Final positions

Mens South American Volleyball Championship, 1985
Men's South American Volleyball Championships
1985 in South American sport
International volleyball competitions hosted by Venezuela 
1985 in Venezuelan sport